St Wulfram's Church, Grantham, is the Anglican parish church of Grantham in Lincolnshire, England. The church is a Grade I listed building and has the second tallest spire in Lincolnshire after Louth's parish church.

In his book England's Thousand Best Churches, Simon Jenkins begins his description of St Wulfram's: "Here is the finest steeple in England", and in 2020 an online contest run by poet Jay Hulme named it as the finest non-cathedral English church.

The spire is the sixth highest in the country (Salisbury, Norwich and Old Coventry Cathedrals' are higher), and third highest of any parish church, after the Church of St Walburge, Preston, and St James' Church, Louth. It is the second highest of any Anglican parish church in the UK, after St James', and second highest in Lincolnshire, after St James'.

In 2013 an appeal was launched to save the spire.

Music
A set of chimes which had been disused for years, and also some quarter jacks, were re-instated during 1877. The new clock and chimes by Gillett and Bland were started on 16 February 1877. On 5 November 1877 the new clock was inspected by Sir Edmund Beckett, who assessed that it was one of the best turned out by Gillett and Bland.

The present organ by John Harris and John Byfield dates from 1735. It was rebuilt by George Pike England in 1809 and 1833, by Forster and Andrews between 1845 and 1868, by Norman and Beard in 1906 (producing the organ that may be heard today), by Rushworth and Dreaper in 1952, by Cousans of Lincoln in 1972, and by Phillip Wood and Sons of Huddersfield in 1993–94 when a fourth manual was added. The case designed by Sir Walter Tapper RA took eight years to complete. The old organ case now encloses the choir vestry in the north west corner of the church. The specification for the organ, regarded as one of the finest in Lincolnshire, can be found at the National Pipe Organ Register.

Organists

 Mr Sweet 1745–1755
 Andrew Strother 1755–1816 (jointly with Francis Sharp 1808–1816)
 Francis Sharp 1808–1832 (jointly with Andrew Strother 1808–1816)
 William Dixon 1832–1863–1865
 George Dixon 1865–1886 (previously organist of St James' Church, Louth)
 Richard Thomas Back 1886–1909–1911
 Frank Radcliffe 1911–1914 (later organist of St Mary's Church, Nottingham)
 Edward Brown 1914–1941
 Stephen John Mundy 1941–1961
 Philip Joseph Lank 1961–1983 (previously assistant organist of Peterborough Cathedral)
 Nicholas Kerrison 1984–1988
 John Ball 1988–1992
 John Wilkes 1992–1996
 Ian Major 1996–1997
 Philip Robinson 1997–2001
 Michael Sands 2002–2007
 Tim Williams 2008–

Gallery

See also
Bishop of Grantham

Sources
Jenkins, Simon (1999), England's Thousand Best Churches, London, Pengin Books, 
Pevsner, Nikolaus; Harris, John; The Buildings of England: Lincolnshire, Penguin (1964), revised by Nicholas Antram (1989), Yale University Press.

References

External links

 St Wulfram's official website

Church of England church buildings in Lincolnshire
Buildings and structures in Grantham
Grade I listed churches in Lincolnshire